Really Groovin' is an album by saxophonist Willis Jackson which was recorded in 1961 and released on the Prestige label.

Reception

Allmusic awarded the album 3 stars stating "A fine, soulful jazz date, mostly slow blues and ballads, from one of the kings of honky-tonk saxophone. Jackson's smooth, Ben Webster-ish tenor playing is seldom surprising, but always satisfying".

Track listing 
All compositions by Willis Jackson except where noted.
 "Careless Love" (W. C. Handy, Spencer Williams) – 4:13   
 "Oatmeal" (Johnny Griffin) – 4:25   
 "I Remember Clifford" (Benny Golson) – 3:48
 "A Twist of Blues" – 5:40
 "Sweet Peter Charleston" (Griffin) – 6:51 
 "Again" (Lionel Newman, Dorcas Cochran) – 4:05
 "He Said, She Said, I Said" – 3:52
 "Girl Of My Dreams" (Sunny Clapp) – 6:40
Recorded at Van Gelder Studio in Englewood Cliffs, New Jersey on January 10, 1961 (tracks 1–7), and April 11, 1961 (track 8)

Personnel 
Willis Jackson – tenor saxophone
Jimmy Neeley (tracks 1–7), Richard Wyands (track 8) – piano   
Wendell Marshall (tracks 1–7), Peck Morrison (track 8) – bass
Gus Johnson (tracks 1–7), Mickey Roker (track 8) – drums
Juan Amalbert – congas (tracks 1–7)

References 

Willis Jackson (saxophonist) albums
1961 albums
Prestige Records albums
Albums recorded at Van Gelder Studio
Albums produced by Esmond Edwards